Ren Baige (1906–1986) was a People's Republic of China politician. He was born in Nanchong, Sichuan Province. He joined the Chinese Communist Party in 1926. He later joined the League of Left-Wing Writers. During the Second Sino-Japanese War, he was in Yan'an. He was vice governor of Sichuan Province, mayor and Chinese Communist Party Committee Secretary of Chongqing.

References

1906 births
1986 deaths
People's Republic of China politicians from Sichuan
Chinese Communist Party politicians from Sichuan
Mayors of Chongqing
Political office-holders in Chongqing
Political office-holders in Sichuan
Politicians from Nanchong
Academic staff of the Counter-Japanese Military and Political University
Educators from Sichuan